The Roman Catholic Diocese of San Justo is located in the city of San Justo, in the province of Buenos Aires.  It was established by Pope Paul VI on 18 July 1969.

Bishops

Ordinaries
 Jorge Carlos Carreras (1969–1982)
 Rodolfo Bufano (1982–1990)
 Jorge Arturo Meinvielle S.D.B. (1991–2003)
 Baldomero Carlos Martini (2004– )

Auxiliary bishops
Rodolfo Bufano (1978-1980), appointed Bishop of Chascomús (later returned here as Bishop)
Antonio Federico Gatti (1996-1998)
Damián Santiago Bitar (2008-2010), appointed Bishop of Oberá

Other priest of this diocese who became bishop
Juan Horacio Suárez, appointed Bishop of Gregorio de Laferrere in 2000

References

External links
 Catholic Hierarchy 

Roman Catholic dioceses in Argentina
Roman Catholic Ecclesiastical Province of Buenos Aires
Christian organizations established in 1969
Roman Catholic dioceses and prelatures established in the 20th century